Cistopus is a genus of octopuses in the family Octopodidae from the Indo-Pacific region, colloquially known as old-lady octopuses. For a long time it was thought that Cistopus was monotypic with the type species, C. indicus, being the only known species. This species was characterised by the possession of eight small mucus filled pouches around the animal's mouth in the web between the bases of each arm, these have an opening which releases the mucus. The function of these pouches is unknown. A new species, C. taiwanicus was described in 2009 from Taiwan. Octopuses in the genus Cistopus are harvested and utilised for food on a commercial basis in southern and eastern Asia. Further new species have been described since then.

Species
The following species are classified in the genus Cistopus:

Cistopus chinensis Zheng, Lin, Lu & Ma, 2012
Cistopus indicus (Rapp (in Férussac & d'Orbigny), 1835)
Cistopus platinoidus Sreeja, Norman & Biju Kumar, 2015
Cistopus taiwanicus Liao & Lu, 2009

References

Octopuses
Cephalopod genera
Taxa named by John Edward Gray